Robert Marion Gist (October 1, 1917 – May 21, 1998) was an American actor and film director.

Life and career 
Gist was reared around the stockyards of Chicago, Illinois, during the Great Depression. Reform school-bound after injuring another boy in a fistfight, Gist instead ended up at Chicago's Hull House, a settlement house originally established by social worker Jane Addams. There he first became interested in acting. 

Work in Chicago radio was followed by stage acting roles in Chicago and on Broadway (in the long-running Harvey with Josephine Hull).  While acting in Harvey, he made his motion picture debut in 20th Century-Fox's Christmas classic Miracle on 34th Street (1947). Gist was also seen on Broadway in director Charles Laughton's The Caine Mutiny Court Martial (1954) with Henry Fonda and John Hodiak.

While shooting Operation Petticoat (1959), Gist told director Blake Edwards that he was interested in directing.  Edwards later hired Gist to helm episodes of the TV series Peter Gunn. Gist also directed episodes of TV shows Naked City, The Twilight Zone, Route 66 and many others.

Gist directed the world premiere of Edna St. Vincent Millay's Conversation at Midnight, produced by Worley Thorne and Susan Davis, in November 1961, on stage, at the Coronet Theatre in Los Angeles. Playing only on the three "off-nights" the theatre was available, Monday through Wednesday, the production was received enthusiastically by critics and audiences, and the small 160-seat theatre was filled to capacity each night for six weeks.  With that success, the production moved to the larger Civic Playhouse, where it ran for more than four more months. In the cast were James Coburn, Jack Albertson, Eduard Franz, Hal England, Sandy Kenyon, Frank DeKova and Bill Berger. Three years later, Gist directed another production of the piece on Broadway, at the Billy Rose Theatre, again produced by Thorne, in association with Davis, with some of the first cast. However, notably absent in key roles were James Coburn and Jack Albertson. The "play," a dramatic dialogue of ideas, delivered in various poetic forms, did not do well on Broadway and closed within the week.

Personal life 
He was married to actress Agnes Moorehead from 1954 to 1958, although they separated in 1955. They met during  the filming of The Stratton Story (1949).

In a 1970 interview with David Frost, Gist discussed his involvement with and commitment to Synanon.

Filmography 

 Miracle on 34th Street (1947) - Department Store Window Dresser (uncredited)
 Jigsaw (1949) - Tommy Quigley
 The Stratton Story (1949) - Earnie
 Scene of the Crime (1949) - P.J. Pontiac
 Oh, You Beautiful Doll (1949) - Musician (uncredited)
 A Dangerous Profession (1949) - Roy Collins, aka Max Gibney
 Wabash Avenue (1950) - Sailor (uncredited)
 I Was a Shoplifter (1950) - Barkie Neff
 Love That Brute (1950) - Rookie Police Officer Wilson (uncredited)
 The Jackpot (1950) - Pete Spooner
 Strangers on a Train (1951) - Det. Leslie Hennessey
 One Minute to Zero (1952) - Maj. Carter
 Angel Face (1953) - Miller
 The Band Wagon (1953) - Hal Benton
 Ford Star Jubilee (1955, TV Series) - Lt. Thomas Keefer
 D-Day the Sixth of June (1956) - Dan Stenick
 Ford Television Theatre (1956, TV Series) - Rev. Wilkerson
 Studio One (1957, TV Series) - Coley Davis
 The Phil Silvers Show (1957, TV Series) - Red Thompson
 Flight (1957, TV Series)
 The Walter Winchell File (1957, TV Series) - Lawton
 The Walter Winchell File "The Boy From Mason City" (1957, TV Series) - Tony Romo
 Richard Diamond, Private Detective (1958, TV Series) - Joe Quincy
 Decision (1958, TV Series) - Dawes
 The Naked and the Dead (1958) - Red
 Gunsmoke (1955-1958, TV Series) - Cam Speegle / Rourke / Rabb Briggs
 Wolf Larsen (1958) - Matthews
 Goodyear Theatre (1959, TV Series) - Ben Moore
 Black Saddle (1959, TV Series) - Milo Dawes
 Al Capone (1959) - Dean O'Banion
 The FBI Story (1959) - Medicine Salesman
 Lock Up (1959, TV Series) - Wayne Powell
 Johnny Ringo (1960, TV Series) - Virgil Kincaid
 Alcoa Theatre (1959, TV Series) - Walter Parker
 Men into Space (1959, TV Series) - Capt. Dan Freer
 Operation Petticoat (1959) - Lt. Watson
 Hawaiian Eye (1960, TV Series) - Barney Mitchell
 The DuPont Show with June Allyson (1960, TV Series) - Lennie Vale
 The Untouchables (1960, TV Series) - Fred 'Caddy' Croner
 Death Valley Days (1960, TV Series) - Aaron Taggert
 Dick Powell's Zane Grey Theater (1960, TV Series)
 General Electric Theater (1960, TV Series) - Committee Chairman
 Hennesey (1960, with Jackie Cooper, recurring role, TV Series) - Dr. Owen King 
 Perry Mason (1960, TV Series) - Deputy D.A. Claude Drumm
 Hotel de Paree (1960) - Zack
 Pony Express (1960, TV Series) - Slater
 Sea Hunt (1960) - Captain Olsen
 Blueprint for Robbery (1961) - Chips McGann
 The Aquanauts (1960, TV Series) - Darrell Willoughby
 The Americans (1961, TV Series) - Gen. Charles P. Stone
 The Law and Mr. Jones (1961, TV Series) - District Attorney Tom Starkowski
 Peter Gunn (1958-1961, TV Series) - Cesar Carlyle / Miles Spence / Jason Willows
 The Detectives Starring Robert Taylor (1962, TV Series) - Tully
 Rawhide (1959-1962, TV Series) - Harleck / Sheriff Ed Stockton / Sheriff
 Have Gun - Will Travel (1958-1962, TV Series) - Gavin O'Shea / Sheriff Ernie Backwater / Ike Brennan / Matt Baker / Ben Tyler
 Jack the Giant Killer (1962) - Scottish Captain
 Vacation Playhouse (1965, TV Series) - Ben Moore
 An American Dream (1966) 
 Nichols (1971, TV Series) - Gulley (final appearance)

also he played a excellent in tales of Wells Fargo 1959

Teaching 
Robert Gist was appointed Head of the School of Arts at the Darling Downs Institute of Advanced Education (DDIAE)
now the University of Southern Queensland, Toowoomba, Australia from the beginning of 1973 to the end of 1975.

Also, during the 1960s, he made himself into a Hollywood acting coach, forming one of the actors' workshops of that time. In 1964, he used its members—who he named "The Group"—to perform several evenings of Carl Sandburg's poetry. The event was titled The People Yes.

Students 
 Philip Barter Cameraman/artist
 Neville Tranter, Australian actor/puppeteer
 Bernd Ullrich, German artist
 Lenore Robbins [nee Lee], Australian dancer and choreographer. Contemporary dancer who, following a brief but highly successful performance career, has influenced a generation of young dancers through a succession of regional dance schools in Queensland, Australia.

References

External links

1917 births
1998 deaths
20th-century American male actors
American male film actors
American film directors
American male television actors
American television directors
Male actors from Los Angeles
Male actors from Miami
Joan Crawford FULL Interview (January 16th, 1970) / https://www.facebook.com/watch/?v=2865131750218048